Bugrino is a village in the Nenets Autonomous Okrug (Arkhangelsk Oblast), Russia, the only town of the municipality "Kolguevsky Village Council", in the Kolguyev Island, Zapolyarny District. It had a population of 424 as of 2010.

Geography
Located on Kolguyev Island, it is the administrative center of the island and part of the Nenets Autonomous Okrug. Communication between the continent and the village Bugrino oil field is carried by sea and by air in winter. Opening of the field allows the airport from November 2002 to take over the whole year average of aircraft (Yak-40, AN-24 and AN-26).

Demographics
The people of Bugrino are mainly oil and gas miners, and herders.

Climate
Bugrino has a subarctic climate (Dfc).

References

 Kolguev or Kalguev Island / / Encyclopedia of Brockhaus and Efron : in 86 volumes (82 tons and 4 ext.) - St. Petersburg.,

Rural localities in Nenets Autonomous Okrug
Old Believer communities in Russia